Anthony John Ireland (born 28 April 1957) is an Australian Catholic bishop. He has served as an Auxiliary Bishop of the Roman Catholic Archdiocese of Melbourne since 2021. Previously parish priest of St Gregory the Great Parish in Doncaster. His episcopal consecration took place on 13 July 2021.

Early life 
Ireland was born in East Melbourne, just a short walk from St Patrick's Cathedral, Melbourne. He was the eldest of three children and grew up in Caulfield, in Melbourne's inner south, in a home that fostered Catholic life and culture. The family attended Mass weekly, prayed the rosary daily and they were all involved in local sodalities.

He received his primary education at St. Aloysius, Caulfield and secondary education at De La Salle College, Malvern, run by the De La Salle Brothers. After graduating, he began work for National Australia Bank and later worked for the City of Hawthorn. He applied for seminary at Corpus Christi College in Clayton in his early 20s and entered in 1981.

Priesthood 
Ireland was ordained to the priesthood on 19 September 1987, by Archbishop of Melbourne Thomas Frank Little at St. Patrick's, Cathedral, Melbourne. Following his ordination, he did a short summer appointment at Nazareth Parish Grovedale and Torquay before his first permanent appointment as assistant priest at St. Patrick's Mentone.

He then served as assistant priest at Sacred Heart, Sandringham. In August 1995, he moved to St Jude's Parish, Langwarrin, firstly as administrator, and then as parish priest for a total of seven years. Later he would concurrently be parish priest at St Francis Xavier in Frankston. He also served as Dean of the Peninsula Deanery.

In 1990, he was asked to study in Rome where he studied both Moral and Spiritual Theology and was awarded higher degrees in both. Later, Archbishop Denis Hart invited him to undertake doctoral studies which were completed at the Pontifical University of St. Thomas Aquinas in Rome where the doctorate was awarded Summa cum Laude.

Since 2009, he has been parish priest of St Gregory the Great Parish in Doncaster.

Episcopate
Ireland was appointed Auxiliary Bishop of Sydney by Pope Francis on 14 May 2021 and was given the titular see of Carinola in Italy. He was consecrated by Archbishop Peter Comensoli on 31 July 2021 in St. Patrick's, Cathedral, Melbourne.

References 

Living people
1957 births
Australian bishops
Roman Catholic bishops of Melbourne
21st-century Roman Catholic bishops in Australia